The 1991 Daytona 500, the 33rd running of the event, was held on February 17, 1991 at Daytona International Speedway in Daytona Beach, Florida as the first race of the 1991 NASCAR Winston Cup season. Davey Allison won the pole. In the first Gatorade 125 on Thursday, Richard Petty edged Hut Stricklin for second place, placing Petty third on the grid.

A notable absentee was 1972 Daytona 500 winner A. J. Foyt. Foyt was badly injured in the Texaco-Havoline 200 IndyCar race at Road America in the fall of 1990. He suffered severe injuries to his feet and legs, and spent several months out of a race car before returning to action at Indianapolis in May 1991. Foyt missed his first Daytona 500 since 1965. The race also marked Rod Osterlund’s final race as an owner.

Pit rules
This race began a series of changes to pit road procedure after the death of a Melling Racing rear tire changer   in a pit road accident at Atlanta the previous November.
Changing tires under caution was banned, under any circumstances. Any tire changed under caution (even if it was flat) resulted in a one-lap penalty.
The signboard man was banned from standing in the pit lane. Instead, teams would utilize signboards on a long pole (i.e. the "lollipop") held by a crew member behind the wall. 
Each car was given a sticker based on their starting position. The sticker was placed on the steering wheel for easy reference. The pit stall selection was staggered to prevent drivers in neighboring stalls from pitting at the same time:
Cars starting in odd-numbered positions were given a blue sticker with a white 1 on it; their pit stalls were selected from the odd-numbered stalls.
Cars starting in even-numbered positions were given an orange sticker with a white 2 on it; their pit stalls were selected from the even-numbered stalls.
After a restart from a caution, the pits would be closed. On the second green lap, a blue flag was waved at the entrance of pit road, allowing only the cars with the blue stickers (odd) to pit for tires. On the next time around, an orange flag would be waved, allowing the cars with orange stickers (even) to pit for tires.
A new pit road speed limit was implemented at all times. During cautions, a second pace car was added, which would lead the cars entering the pits, and set the speed down the pit lane.
Penalties were severe: a 1-lap penalty for changing tires during a caution or pitting with the wrong group (blue/orange). A 15-second penalty for overshooting the pit stall, or for crew members jumping over the wall too soon.

The new pit procedures changed the complexity of the race. Teams considered it too time-consuming to change four tires since it had to be done under green (at the time, a four-tire pit stop would take roughly 20–25 seconds). For an example of how the rules adversely affected the racing, Kyle Petty ran the entire 500 miles on the same left side tires. Bill Elliott suffered a flat tire early on, and was forced to limp around the track at a reduced pace for two laps before he was allowed to pit, effectively eliminating him from the competition.

By April, the rules were changed. At Bristol, the blue/orange procedure was used only for cautions. The pits were closed at the onset of caution, then opened after the pace car had picked up the leader and the field was sufficiently "packed-up" (that usually took one lap). Once the pits were opened, blue sticker cars would pit the first lap by, with orange sticker cars pitting the next time around. On the restarts, blue sticker cars started on the inside and orange sticker cars on the outside. Lapped cars went to the rear. The blue/orange rule was eliminated during green flag stops. By the next week at North Wilkesboro, the blue/orange rule was scrapped. In its place, once the pits were opened during a yellow, lead lap cars only were allowed to pit on the first lap under caution, while lapped cars had to wait until the second lap.

After a few weeks, the rules were relaxed further. The pit road speed limit and use of the "lollipop" style signboard were the significant changes made permanent (and remain to this day). The second pace car for the pit lane was eliminated. Drivers would be required to gauge their own pit lane speed (by monitoring their RPMs) and officials enforced the infractions with a system similar to VASCAR. The rule closing pit road when the caution comes out also remained in place, as well as only permitting lead lap cars to pit on the first caution lap (lapped cars on the second).

Race

The start
Davey Allison led the first lap from Dale Earnhardt, who took the lead entering Turn 1. On the backstretch, Earnhardt obliterated a seagull. It forced Earnhardt's team to make emergency repairs under one of the many early cautions in the race.

Early yellows
Sprint car champion Sammy Swindell spun on the backstretch to bring out the first yellow flag. Five laps after the restart, Rick Wilson and Greg Sacks collided in Turn 1, ending Sacks' day. Just after the restart, Bill Elliott cut a tire, but had to wait for the proper lap for a pit stop. On lap 31, Jimmy Spencer's engine blew, filling the car with smoke. A fire also erupted just after Spencer climbed out to catch his breath. Meanwhile, turn 4 was coated with oil, gathering Jeff Purvis, Jimmy Means, Phil Barkdoll, and again Sammy Swindell. Barkdoll would soon spin again in Turn 4, blowing out his windshield in the spin and nearly flipping. The windshield slid across the track and into Ken Schrader's bumper and air dam, puncturing the radiator and causing a lengthy repair that eliminated the three-time Daytona 500 polesitter from contention. 1990 Winston Cup runner-up Mark Martin moved through the field quickly in the early going, but was also eliminated from contention as the center section of the car's rear gearing sheared completely off of the driveshaft, causing him to spend many laps behind the wall.

Long green flag run
On Lap 75, Geoff Bodine, Eddie Bierschwale and Phil Barkdoll ran three-wide coming out of turn 4. Bierschwale slid up the track and into Bodine's left-rear quarter panel, sending Bodine into a spin and into Jim Sauter, who was slowing to enter the pits. The caution flag came out and all four cars continued in the race. However, Bodine spent several laps in the pits because the rim of his left-rear wheel had been so badly warped in the collision that the crew could not remove the lug nuts to change the now flat left-rear tire. This incident effectively eliminated Bodine from contention and he later retired with an oil leak.

This would be the last caution flag for over 100 laps, and the new pit rules confused the running order during the long green flag run. The lead changed hands many times, as Dale Earnhardt, Joe Ruttman, Davey Allison, Sterling Marlin, Rick Mast, Kyle Petty, Ernie Irvan, and Darrell Waltrip had all pitted on varying laps.

Late-race drama
With 16 laps to go, Richard Petty and off-road racer Robby Gordon tangled on the backstretch. Polesitter and leader Davey Allison pitted with the leaders, allowing Rusty Wallace to take the lead. He was quickly shuffled off of the lead on the restart, and was touched by Kyle Petty in Turn 4, which broke the car loose and sent him into a spin. Rick Mast narrowly avoided Wallace, but Darrell Waltrip, unsighted, collided with Wallace's left rear quarter panel, before Wallace slammed into the inside retaining wall, eliminating both cars. Seconds later, Derrike Cope lost control entering the tri-oval while trying to avoid Waltrip's damaged car. Cope spun across the infield and back across the track almost at the start/finish line and into the path of Hut Stricklin. With nowhere to go, Stricklin slammed nearly head-on into the rear of Cope's car, sending him bouncing off Harry Gant's car and down the straightaway with no brakes and virtually no steering. At the final restart on lap 193, the order was Earnhardt, Irvan, Petty, Ruttman, Marlin, Mast, and Allison, the only cars remaining on the lead lap.  Leader Dale Earnhardt was passed by Ernie Irvan a lap after the green flag returned, and Davey Allison made up four positions in one lap to run third. Irvan began to pull away while Earnhardt spent several laps battling Davey Allison for 2nd. With 2 laps to go, Earnhardt got loose while running side by side under Allison exiting turn 2. The two cars tapped each other, pushing Allison into the outside wall briefly before the car spun into the infield towards Lake Lloyd, slamming into the earthen embankment as Allison had done early in the 1989 race. Earnhardt spun down the backstretch and into the path of Kyle Petty, who slammed into Earnhardt's right front fender, launching the car into the air briefly before it landed back on its wheels. Ernie Irvan coasted to the checkers to become the first Californian since Marvin Panch in 1961 to win the Daytona 500.

Results

References

Daytona 500
Daytona 500
NASCAR races at Daytona International Speedway